The Third Schafalpenkopf, Highest Schafalpenkopf (Höchster Schafalpenkopf) or Northeastern Schafalpenkopf (Nordöstlicher Schafalpenkopf) is a 2,320-metre-high mountain in the Allgäu Alps. It is part of the Mindelheimer Klettersteig.

References

External links 

Two-thousanders of Austria
Mountains of the Alps
Mountains of Bavaria
Mountains of Tyrol (state)
Allgäu Alps
Oberallgäu
Two-thousanders of Germany